Le Fauga is a railway station in Le Fauga, Occitanie, France. The station is on the Toulouse–Bayonne railway line. The station is served by TER (local) services operated by the SNCF.

Train services
The following services currently call at Le Fauga:
local service (TER Occitanie) Toulouse–Saint-Gaudens–Tarbes–Pau

References

Railway stations in Haute-Garonne
Railway stations in France opened in 1862